Brigitte Gertrud Steden also known as Brigitte Potthoff and Brigitte Pickartz (16 March 1949 – 14 April 1999) was a badminton player from Germany. Brigitte won a bronze medal in 1972 Munich Olympics when Badminton was played as a demonstration sport. She also won medals at the European Championships and is a winner of several other international tournaments in Germany, Netherlands, France, Switzerland and Sweden. Her most notable achievements include runner-up performance at the 1975 All England Open.

Achievements

Olympic Games (demonstration)

European Championships

International tournaments

References

External links 

1949 births
1999 deaths
German female badminton players
Badminton players at the 1972 Summer Olympics
Sportspeople from Wuppertal